Lake Nacogdoches is a lake located about 10 miles west of the city of Nacogdoches, Texas on Loco Bayou dam. Loco Bayou dam is connected to the Angelina River because it is a Tributary, of which is also a part of the Neches River basin.

History 
The Loco Bayou dam of which lake Nacogdoches was created, was constructed and completed by Freese & Nichols from the mid-1970s to 1977.  The dam is primarily made of an earthen type and was built for municipal water supply, yet its primary purpose was for recreational purposes. Currently, the Lake is operated and owned by the City of Nacogdoches.

Hydrology 
The lake was impounded in 1976, has a surface area of 2,212 acres, and a maximum depth of 40 feet. Currently, the lake quality has a clarity value of moderately clear. According to the Texas State Historical Association, the capacity of the lake at a normal level is 42,318 acre-feet and a maximum value of 122,000 acre-feet.

Flora 
According to the Texas Parks and Wildlife Department, the aquatic flora that are found in the lake are mainly Hydrilla and the American lotus.

Fauna 
According to the Texas Parks and Wildlife Department, the main fish species that occupy Nacogdoches lake are: Largemouth bass, Crappie, and Sunfish.

Uses/Purpose 
Presently, Lake Nacogdoches is used primarily for game fishing.

References 

Lakes of Texas